Stitch Encounter is an interactive show located in Walt Disney Studios Park (under the name Stitch Live!), and in Tomorrowland at Tokyo Disneyland and Shanghai Disneyland Park. The first edition of the show at Hong Kong Disneyland was closed on May 2, 2016, to make room for Star Wars: Command Post, although it temporarily returned to Hong Kong in 2019 for a limited-time as a "Magic Access Members"-exclusive event.

Disney attractions similar to Stitch Encounter include Turtle Talk with Crush, located in Epcot at the Walt Disney World Resort, Disney California Adventure Park at the Disneyland Resort and in Tokyo DisneySea, as well as Monsters, Inc. Laugh Floor at the Magic Kingdom in Walt Disney World. Neither of the American Disney resorts have ever seen the release of this attraction, with Stitch's Great Escape! in Magic Kingdom having been the sole major Lilo & Stitch-themed attraction in the United States.

The attraction is a prime example of both-real time animation and digital puppetry. Stitch Encounter consists of an unscripted, real-time conversation between park guests and the animated character Stitch from Disney's Lilo & Stitch franchise. The attraction, which opened in July 2006, was part of a three attraction expansion to Tomorrowland, Hong Kong. It is located adjacent to the entrance of Space Mountain. The attraction offers shows in different languages depending on the version—Cantonese, English and Mandarin in the original Hong Kongese version (Cantonese only for the 2019 event), French and English in the Parisian version, Japanese in the Tokyo version, and Mandarin in the Chinese version—to accommodate the variety of languages guests in the different parks speak. Show times are available at the entrance of the attraction and each show has a length of approximately 15 minutes.

On July 1, 2021, following Disneyland Paris' reopening, Walt Disney Studios Park announced that the attraction is set to become part of Studio D.

Attraction description 
Guests are seated in a movie theater-like room, called the Space Traffic Control. Children are then encouraged to sit up front, on the floor, so that Stitch can see them during the show. At the start of the show, the host of the Space Traffic Control requests the computer to search for an available spacecraft captain to talk to; the computer connects to the spacecraft which Stitch is in. After that, guests (both children and adults) in the Space Traffic Control are randomly chosen by Stitch to interact with. Stitch can interact with guests in many ways such as chatting, singing them a song with his ukulele and even take their pictures. Stitch looks, moves and sounds much like he does in the films and Lilo & Stitch: The Series, complete with corresponding facial expressions, gestures, and vocals (which the hidden actor performing him delivers in a mimicry of that used by the character's creator and original voice actor, Chris Sanders). The conclusion of the show occurs when the audience aids Stitch in his escape from Captain Gantu (Kevin Michael Richardson).

See also 
 Hong Kong Disneyland attraction and entertainment history
 Stitch's Great Escape!
 Turtle Talk with Crush
 Monsters, Inc. Laugh Floor

References

External links 
 Walt Disney Studios Park - Stitch Live!
 Tokyo Disneyland - Stitch Encounter
 Shanghai Disneyland - Stitch Encounter

Amusement park attractions introduced in 2006
Amusement park attractions introduced in 2019
Amusement park attractions that closed in 2019
Lilo & Stitch in amusement parks
Hong Kong Disneyland
Walt Disney Studios Park
Tokyo Disneyland
Shanghai Disneyland
Tomorrowland
Production Courtyard (Walt Disney Studios Park)
2006 establishments in Hong Kong
2016 disestablishments in Hong Kong
2008 establishments in France
2015 establishments in Japan
2016 establishments in China